Negeta is a genus of moths of the family Nolidae first described by Francis Walker in 1862.

Description
Palpi reaching just above vertex of head and very slender. Thorax smoothly scaled. Abdomen with dorsal tuft at base. Tibia not hairy. Forewings short and broad, with arched costa and inner margin. Outer margin angled. Veins 8,9,10 stalked. Hindwings with vein 5 from near lower angle of cell.

Species
 Negeta abbreviata (Walker, 1862)
 Negeta albigrisea (Hampson, 1910)
 Negeta albiplagiata Hampson, 1918
 Negeta approximans Hampson, 1912
 Negeta argentula Viete, 1976
 Negeta aureata Holloway, 2003
 Negeta cinerascens (Holland, 1894)
 Negeta contrariata Walker, 1862
 Negeta cyrtogramma Prout, 1927
 Negeta ecclipsis (Holland, 1894)
 Negeta incisurata Gaede, 1916
 Negeta luminosa (Walker, 1858)
 Negeta mesoleuca (Holland, 1894)
 Negeta molybdota Hampson, 1912
 Negeta montanata Holloway, 2003
 Negeta noloides Draudt, 1950
 Negeta nubilicosta (Holland, 1894)
 Negeta ochreoplaga (Bethune-Baker, 1909)
 Negeta ochrichalceaarcuata Gaede, 1916
 Negeta olivaria (Warren, 1916)
 Negeta phaeopepla (Hampson, 1905)
 Negeta purpurascens Hampson, 1912
 Negeta reticulata (Berio, 1964)
 Negeta ruficeps (Hampson, 1902)
 Negeta secretaria Bryk, 1913
 Negeta semialba Hampson, 1918
 Negeta soliera (Swinhoe, 1895)
 Negeta stalactitis (Hampson, 1905)
 Negeta straminea (Hampson, 1891)
 Negeta ulula Bryk, 1913

References

Chloephorinae